Leire Halt railway station was a railway halt serving Leire in Leicestershire on the line between  and .

The London, Midland and Scottish Railway opened the halt in 1925 on the Leicester – Rugby line of the former Midland Counties Railway. British Railways closed the Leicester – Rugby line and its stations in 1962.

References

Railway stations in Great Britain opened in 1925
Railway stations in Great Britain closed in 1962
Former London, Midland and Scottish Railway stations
Disused railway stations in Leicestershire